The following is a very incomplete list of notable works in the collections of the Musée du Louvre in Paris. For a list of works based on 5,500 paintings catalogued in the Joconde database, see the Catalog of paintings in the Louvre Museum.

See also 
 :Category:Collections of the Louvre

 
Lists of works of art